While the first mention of events related to the history of the Baháʼí Faith in New Zealand was in 1846 continuous contact began around 1904 when one individual after another came in contact with Baháʼís and some of them published articles in print media in New Zealand as early as 1908. The first Baháʼí in the Antipodes was Dorothea Spinney who had just arrived from New York in Auckland in 1912. Shortly thereafter there were two converts about 1913 – Robert Felkin who had met ʻAbdu'l-Bahá in London in 1911 and moved to New Zealand in 1912 and is considered a Baháʼí by 1914 and Margaret Stevenson who first heard of the religion in 1911 and by her own testimony was a Baháʼí in 1913. After ʻAbdu'l-Bahá wrote the Tablets of the Divine Plan which mentions New Zealand the community grew quickly so that the first Baháʼí Local Spiritual Assembly of the country was attempted in 1923 or 1924 and then succeeded in 1926. The Baháʼís of New Zealand elected their first independent National Spiritual Assembly in 1957. By 1963 there were four Assemblies, and 18 localities with smaller groups of Baháʼís. The 2018 census reports about 2925 Baháʼís in some 45 local assemblies though the Association of Religion Data Archives estimated there were some 7518 Baháʼís in 2010.

Beginnings 

The first mention of events related to the history of the religion was a report in a Wellington newspaper in July 1846. These were reprints of an 1845 article in the London Times which relied on Muslim reactions to the new religion.

In 1853 there was an event with caused great suffering on Babís ( who Baháʼís hold as a direct precursor akin to the relationship between John the Baptist and Jesus.) The Babís were blamed for an attempted assassination of the Shah of Persia. Recent scholarship has identified a fringe element distinct from all the major aspects of the religion, its community and leadership at the time. Nevertheless, coverage in newspapers at the time often echoed the Persian government's view blaming the Babís and Babís in large numbers were in fact executed as a result.

Following this initial mention of incidents related to the religion there were several contacts between New Zealanders and Baháʼís at the beginning of the 20th century. New Zealander Wilhelmina Sherriff Bain may have met Sarah Jane Farmer, a notable Baháʼí in the United States, (see Green Acre) in 1904. Whoever her contact was, Bain authored a large detailed article in the Otago Witness published edition of 30 December 1908 about the religion. Other articles followed in 1909, 1911, and 1913. It is also known that letters were exchanged in 1910 between a Mildred Burdon of Geraldine and ʻAbdu'l-Bahá. Robert Felkin had met ʻAbdu'l-Bahá in London in 1911 and in 1912 moved to New Zealand where he helped found the Whare Ra. Felkin wrote an article for a New Zealand publication which was published around then too.

Meanwhile, Auckland resident Margaret Stevenson's sister living in the United Kingdom had sent her a copy of "The Christian Commonwealth" which had reported on ʻAbdu'l-Bahá's speech in London on 27 March 1911. In 1912 Stevenson rented a room to English Baháʼí Dorothea Spinney – a traveling performer of Greek plays – who had just arrived from New York via Auckland. Spinney's stay was probably brief as she is known to have been in New York in November 1912 and again in January 1913. Following learning from a Baháʼí first hand Stevenson decided to subscribed to Star of the West, an early major English publication of the religion, and officially accepted the religion in 1913. Though Felkin is more known for being involved with other interests, another early Baháʼí, Maurice Chambers, counts Felkin as the Baháʼí through whom he learned of the religion and converted in 1914.

Whoever converted first, there was at least one Baháʼí in New Zealand in 1912 and more shortly thereafter.

Growth of the community 

ʻAbdu'l-Bahá wrote a series of letters, or tablets, to the followers of the religion in the United States in 1916–1917; these letters were compiled together in the book titled Tablets of the Divine Plan. The seventh of the tablets was the first to mention spreading the Baháʼí Faith in New Zealand and was written on 11 April 1916, but was delayed in being presented in the United States until 1919 because of disruptions from World War I and the Spanish flu which strongly affected New Zealand and beyond. These tablets were translated and presented by Mirza Ahmad Sohrab on 4 April 1919, and published in Star of the West magazine on 12 December 1919. Chambers is known to have exchanged letters with ʻAbdu'l-Bahá in 1919. Stevenson received a visit by Australian community founders John and Clara Hyde-Dunn in 1922 and again in 1923 and the New Zealand community quickly grew, including Stevenson's sisters Amy and Lilias. The community tried to form an Assembly without properly following procedure in 1923 or 1924. In 1924 Martha Root shared news that Shoghi Effendi, then head of the religion, had space to receive New Zealander Baháʼís undertaking pilgrimage. 1924 was also the year of the first pioneer from New Zealand when Nora Lee moved to Fiji from 1924 to about 1930. In 1925 Stevenson left with two other New Zealand converts as well as a contingent from Australia for a year-long trip on pilgrimage where they stayed some 19 days and then visited with the community of the Baháʼí Faith in the United Kingdom. The news journal Herald of the South was begun publishing for New Zealand and Australia during their voyage out of Auckland (transferred publishing to Adelaide Australia in 1931.)

After receiving a compilation on forming Assemblies they then returned to New Zealand in December 1925. They also returned with some dust from the Tomb of Baháʼu'lláh which was placed in New Zealand soil at Stevenson's home in a ceremony held on 14 February 1926. Later in 1926 the Baháʼís in Auckland were able to properly elect their first Baháʼí Local Spiritual Assembly. In 1928 there were seven assemblies between New Zealand and Australia – by 1939 the number of assemblies had reduced to 4 but the locations with Baháʼís increased to 17 and by 1940 the count of assemblies reached 19 while there were still 17 other locations with smaller groups of Baháʼís. In 1931 Keith Ransom-Kehler also visited. In 1934 Baháʼís from Australia and New Zealand elected a regional National Assembly - there were three delegates from Auckland, three from Sydney and three from Adelaide. From 1934 to 1939 Stevenson served on the regional National Spiritual Assembly of Australia and New Zealand and then died shortly thereafter in 1941. In 1940 the community held its first season school. In 1947 Alvin and Gertrude Blum left the United States for New Zealand where they lived until 1953 when they pioneered and became Knights of Baháʼu'lláh for the Solomon Islands.
In 1948 the first person of Māori descent to accept the Baháʼí Faith was Albert White, who was one quarter Māori. In 1949 the first Persian Baháʼí pioneer, Manoochehr Alaʼi, arrived as a student at Massey College. In 1953 the first standing Hand of the Cause, the highest appointed position in the religion open to all, ʻAlí-Akbar Furútan, visited New Zealand. In 1957 the New Zealand community held its first independent convention to elect its own National Spiritual Assembly with three delegates from Auckland and two each from Devonport, New Plymouth and Wellington. This convention elected the first National Spiritual Assembly of New Zealand. In 1958 Hand of the Cause of God, Enoch Olinga visited the Ngāruawāhia Marae and talked with elders and four years later, when Hand of the Cause of God, Dr Muhajir visited, Ephraim Te Paa, a Kaumatua (Māori elder) from Ahipara converted to the religion. In 1963 with the election of the Universal House of Justice the Hands of the Cause updated and published a kind of census of the religion. At that time there were four assemblies -Auckland, Devonport, Hamilton, Wellington – and 18 localities with smaller groups of Baháʼís – see maps. The story of one convert in 1964 includes her concern for her biracial children and despair at the bigotry of interracial marriage among the very minorities her children were members (she being Celt and married a Māori) when she found this kind of marriage highly accepted among Baháʼís. The members of the National Assembly, who participated in the convention for the first election of the Universal House of Justice, were: Hugh Blundell, John Carr, Margaret Harnish, Linda Hight, Percy Leadley, Phyllis Milne, Jean Simmons, Douglas Weeks, and Terry Stirling. The New Zealand Baháʼí community came to the assistance of refugees in 1979 from the persecution of Baháʼís in Iran who were allowed to settle in New Zealand. Between 1987 and 1989, a further 142 Iranian Baháʼís settled in New Zealand.

Modern community 

Since its inception the religion has had involvement in socio-economic development beginning by giving greater freedom to women, promulgating the promotion of female education as a priority concern, and that involvement was given practical expression by creating schools, agricultural coops, and clinics. The religion entered a new phase of activity when a message of the Universal House of Justice dated 20 October 1983 was released. Baháʼís were urged to seek out ways, compatible with the Baháʼí teachings, in which they could become involved in the social and economic development of the communities in which they lived. Worldwide in 1979, there were 129 officially recognized Baháʼí socio-economic development projects. By 1987, the number of officially recognized development projects had increased to 1482. In the modern Baháʼí community of New Zealand the Baháʼís have multiplied their interests internally and externally. Aside from major themes there have also been individual work done in variety of topics – for example post-traumatic stress syndrome. Additionally the community has continued to advocate with the New Zealand government to speak up on behalf of the persecuted Baháʼís in Iran.

Race Relations 

In 1997 the Baháʼí community approached the Race Relations Conciliator with a project to honor the memory of Hedi Moani, an Iranian-born Baháʼí who worked to promote positive race relations. Discussions took place over many months and on 10 December 1998 (Human Rights Day), the Race Relations Office formally announced that Race Unity Day would be celebrated in New Zealand on 21 March each year. The first awards were in 2001. There are reviews of speeches in 2007, 2008, and 2009. National coverage of events with the police was affirmed in 2008. In addition to national-scale events various localities have had local competitions – an example was the observance in Whangarei and Lower Hutt in 2009. In 2012 then 13-year-old Rima Shenoy submitted a video that won first place in the Race Unity Speech Awards of the New Zealand Police and the Baháʼís.

Development 

As the Baháʼí community has grown in size and complexity it has also run into controversies and survived. In the 1980s there was a controversy about the status of women not being electable to the Universal House of Justice. In 1989 there was a controversy over the burial of a Māori Baháʼí, Pakaka Tawhai. Though the National Assembly had consulted with Tawhai's wife about burial, Pakaka's tribal family, the Ngati Porou, confronted the Baháʼís during the tangihanga, demanding to take his body back to Ruatoria. Ultimately they failed. Then member of the Universal House of Justice Peter Khan spoke at a conference in New Zealand in 2000, noting that the Universal House of Justice had received letters "written in distasteful language" from New Zealand – he encouraged systematic education of children, application of a moral life, a serious study of the Covenant of Baháʼu'lláh, and study of the writings of Shoghi Effendi.

Beyond controversies, the Baháʼís in New Zealand have broadened their interests both through individual initiatives and collective action. In 1991 an assembly was elected in the Kapiti Coast District. In 2000 two Baháʼí pioneers from New Zealand settled in Pitcairn Islands, one of the few nations on earth that had no Baháʼí presence. In 2006 Baháʼís helped dedicate the temporary Spiritual Centre at Middlemore Hospital. In 2007 Dunedin Baháʼís had been granted access to a community center. The Universal House of Justice called for a regional conference for the Baháʼís from New Zealand, the Cook Islands, Fiji, Hawaii, Kiribati, New Caledonia and the Loyalty Islands, Samoa, Tonga, Tuvalu, and Vanuatu to be held in Auckland's Manukau City, on the sacred grounds of their marae, in 2008 and it came to pass in February 2009. The Baháʼí on Air television show is broadcast weekly on Auckland's Triangle TV which also covers the Cook Islands, American Samoa, and Adelaide, Australia. There has also been an independent documentary by a non-Baháʼí New Zealander exploring the religion in 2007. In 2011 Baháʼís participated in the community memorial for those who had died in the 2011 Christchurch earthquake. It was mentioned in a review of spirituality in business in 2012. The community in Tauranga invited the Baháʼís to join their interfaith council.

Demographics 

A 1999 report from the census bureau noted that of the citizens of New Zealand of Middle Eastern ethnicity, 4% were Baháʼí and 20% of the Baháʼís in New Zealand are members of some ethnic minority. The 1991 and 2006 New Zealand census reports about 2800 Baháʼís though the 1996 census listed just over 3100 Baháʼís. The Association of Religion Data Archives (relying mostly on the World Christian Encyclopedia) estimated some 7400 Baháʼís in 2005. There are more than 65 local Baháʼí communities around New Zealand, the large city communities have hundreds of members and assemblies, while some rural areas having groups of just two or three Baháʼís. About 46 are full-fledged assemblies. The religion was called a "mainstream religion" by the International Union for Conservation of Nature.

Well known individuals 

The Bahá´í Association For the Arts and its publication Arts Dialogue has produced a lists of New Zealand Baháʼí artists, reviews of the shows and articles published dealing with New Zealand. The national assembly posted profiles of some Baháʼís in 2011.

 Barry Crump was a writer of semi-autobiographical comic novels who travelled widely and became a Baháʼí about 1982.
 Sheryl Davis works for a charitable trust focused on promoting economic development and tourism in the northern part of the country.
 Russell Garcia – Garcia is from Oakland, California and is a composer who has worked with major Hollywood artists and producers. Garcia and his wife Gina have been members of the Baháʼí Faith since 1955. In 1966 they set sail and ended up in the south Pacific when some musicians from Auckland, New Zealand invited Russell to do some live concerts, radio and television shows and to lecture at the various universities around the country on behalf of the New Zealand Broadcasting Commission and Music Trades Association. Russell, finished with his lectures and concerts and on advice of friends, drove up to the Bay of Islands in the north of North Island where they live.
 Heather Simpson is a District Court judge, enrolled in the Baháʼí community in 1983.
 Murray Robert Smith was a member of the New Zealand Parliament from 1972 to 1975. He later enrolled in the Baháʼí community and served on the national governing body for two years before he and his wife, Miette, began a period of service at the Baháʼí World Centre in Haifa, Israel, which lasted from 1994 to 2007. At the Baháʼí World Centre, Murray served as Deputy Secretary General of the Baháʼí International Community, a role centred on developing the Baháʼí community's contributions to wider society. Note government service is not proscribed, just partisan politics.
 Ken Zemke – Zemke was a freelance film editor working in Hollywood in 1972 when he became a Baháʼí after working on comedy TV series such as Hogan's Heroes and eventually won an Emmy in 1974, for an episode in the series Medical Story TV Series. However he and his wife soon moved to New Zealand in 1981 where he continued work in movie production – winning New Zealand Guild of Film and Television award for best editing for Came a Hot Friday while continuing to be involved with documentaries and projects associated with the Baháʼí Faith through individual initiative or commissioned as well as his own ongoing project – Baháʼí on Air.

See also 

 Religion in New Zealand
 History of New Zealand
 Baháʼí Faith in Australia

Further reading 

 
 Letters from the Guardian to Australia and New Zealand Author: Shoghi Effendi, Source: Australia, 1971 reprint.
 

 New Zealander Jess Firth has produced an independent serious documentary exploring the religion: The Wayfarer. Firth is interviewed at A Baha'i Perspective: Jess Firth.

References

Further reading 
 Ross, Margaret J. 1979. "Some Aspects of the Baháʼí Faith in New Zealand." M.A. Thesis. University of Auckland

External links 
 Official website of the National Spiritual Assembly of the Baháʼís of New Zealand
 The Baha'i youth community of Dunedin
 Manawatu/ The Baha'i youth community of Feilding
 Kapiti Coast District Baháʼí Community
 The Baháʼí Faith in Lower Hutt
 Baháʼís of Wellington City
 Baha'i Society at the University of Otago
 

Bahá'í Faith in New Zealand